Thacheth Neelakanta Menon, better known as Appan Thacheth (10 November 1937 – 2 July 2011), was a Malayalam-language poet and lyricist from Kerala, India.

Thacheth was born in 1937 in Elamkulam, Cochin, as the son of Kandaveli Achuthan Pillai and Elamkulam Thacheth Sanikutty Amma. After completing his bachelor's degree in Arts and diploma in business management, he joined Larson and Toubro in Madras. He worked at the Madras Atomic Power Station, Abu Dhabi International Airport and Lotus Temple in Delhi. He also worked in Calcutta and Germany. He retired as Senior Quality Control Engineer in 1998. He published over 50 collections of poems. Some of his works include Poopalika (1963), Apsarassukal (1965), Udayasthamayangal (1966), Nirangal Nizhalukal (1979), Ekakiyude Veena (1987), Ninne Kurichu Veendum (1988), Gopurathile Kuruvi (1989) and Kaliveedu (1989). He penned the lyrics for around ten Malayalam films, including Sindooram (1976), Rajaankanam (1976), Rajaparambara (1977), Beena (1978), Mookkilla Rajyathu Murimookkan Rajavu (1996), Varavaay (2000) and Randu Penkuttikal (2002). "Devi Nin Chiriyil" from Rajaparambara is one of his most famous songs.

Thacheth died on 2 July 2011 at his residence in Pukkattupadi near Cochin. He was survived by his wife, two sons and a daughter.

References

External links
 

1937 births
2011 deaths
People from Ernakulam district
Writers from Kochi
20th-century Indian poets
Malayalam-language writers
Malayalam poets
Malayalam-language lyricists
Film people from Kerala